James Ames may refer to:

 James Barr Ames (1846–1910), American law educator
 James W. Ames (1864–1944), African-American physician